The 1840 Chicago mayoral election saw Democratic nominee Alexander Loyd defeat incumbent Whig Benjamin Wright Raymond by a landslide 15.8 point margin.

With a narrative that local elections such as Chicago's would be a bellwether of the coming 1840 United States presidential election, both parties locally viewed the election as being of great importance. Chicago's mayoral result, ultimately, was no bellwether of the presidential election's party outcome.

The election was held on March 3.

Results

References

Mayoral elections in Chicago
Chicago
1840s in Chicago